The following is a list of the 10 municipalities (comuni) of the Province of Barletta-Andria-Trani, Apulia, Italy. The capitals of the province are in bold.

List

See also
List of municipalities of Italy

References

Barletta-Andria-Trani